Harlan Parker Banks (September 1, 1913 - November 22, 1998) was an American paleobotanist and Liberty Hyde Bailey Professor Emeritus in the College of Agriculture and Life Sciences at Cornell University, known for his studies of Devonian plants. A Fulbright Research Scholar and Guggenheim Fellow, he was a fellow of the American Association for the Advancement of Science, a member of the National Academy of Sciences, and president of the Botanical Society of America.

References

External links

 David L. Dilcher, "Harlan P. Banks", Biographical Memoirs of the National Academy of Sciences (2019)

1913 births
1998 deaths
Paleobotanists
American botanists
Cornell University faculty
Fellows of the American Association for the Advancement of Science
Members of the United States National Academy of Sciences
American paleontologists
Fulbright alumni